Buri Nagar, commonly known as Burinagar, is a census village under Natun Dehar Gram Panchayat in Nalbari district, Assam, India. As per 2011 Census of India, the village has a total population of 2,555 people, including 1,344 males and 1,211 females, and has a literacy rate of 75.34%.

Burinagar has a history of being militancy affected area. At Burinagar, on 17 March 1999, the ULFA militants killed 3 youths in suspicion of being informers of police. On 5 January 2006, ex president of Nalbari block Congress Chand Muhammad Ali was killed by the NDFB militants at Burinagar.

References 

Assam